Live in Concert is the first and only live album by American rap group 2 Live Crew and their fifth record overall. It was released under the Effect subsidiary label of Luke Records, a move that was deemed necessary for the company to be able to release additional 2 Live Crew material outside of their distribution deal with Atlantic Records, which was signed in 1990 – the same year they released Banned In The U.S.A.. The album peaked at number 46 on the Top R&B/Hip-Hop Albums.

Track listing

Note
 Track 8 contents elements from "It Takes Two" by Rob Base & DJ E-Z Rock (1988)

Personnel 
 Luther Roderick Campbell - performer, producer, executive producer
 David P. Hobbs - performer, producer
 Mark D. Ross - performer
 Christopher Wong Won - performer
 Robert Margouleff - engineer
 Brant Biles - assistant engineer
 Brian Jackson - photography

References

External links 

1990 live albums
2 Live Crew albums